The Exchange Bank of India & Africa was an Indian bank with a number of overseas branches in East African countries that operated from 1942 until its failure in 1949.  It expanded rapidly across the trade routes between India and Africa but suffered a crisis in 1949 which caused it to fail.

History
The bank was established in Bombay in 1942. It expanded rapidly and at its peak had branches in India at Ahmedabad, Amraoti, Amritsar, Bhavnagar, Bangalore, Calcutta, Cochin, Delhi, Karachi, Khamagaon, Kolhapur, Madras, Madura, Nagpur, Rajkot, Surendranagar, Tinnevelly, and Tuticorin. It also had overseas branches at Aden, Colombo,  Dar-es-Salam, Jaffna, Jinga, Kampala, London, Mombasa, and Nairobi. The bank opened three East African branches in 1947, with the branch in Tanzania opening in late 1948. 

A crisis developed in the bank from about mid-February 1949, resulting in a heavy run on the bank. The bank suspended payments in May and was liquidated in June 1949. The Managing Director of the bank at the time, Jaswantrai Manilal Akhaney, was charged with and found guilty of criminal breach of trust for disposing of certain securities that a client had deposited with the bank.

Citations

References

American Indian Fund (1948) Indian affairs. (New York, Association on American Indian Affairs).
 

Defunct banks of India
Banks established in 1942
1942 establishments in India